The men's parallel bars competition was one of eight events for male competitors in artistic gymnastics at the 1976 Summer Olympics in Montreal. The qualification and final rounds took place on July 18, 20, and 23rd at the Montreal Forum. There were 90 competitors from 20 nations, with nations competing in the team event having 6 gymnasts while other nations could have up to 3 gymnasts. The event was won by Sawao Katō of Japan, the first man to successfully defend an Olympic title in the parallel bars—and, as of the 2016 Games, still the only one to do so (the most decorated parallel bars gymnast, Li Xiaopeng, had his two gold medals separated by a bronze). It was the fourth consecutive victory by a Japanese gymnast in the event, breaking a tie with Switzerland for most all-time. Japan was unable to repeat its 1972 medal sweep, as nations were now limited to two finalists each. Nikolai Andrianov of the Soviet Union took silver, while Mitsuo Tsukahara of Japan earned bronze, missing a 1–2 finish for Japan by .025 points.

Background

This was the 14th appearance of the event, which is one of the five apparatus events held every time there were apparatus events at the Summer Olympics (no apparatus events were held in 1900, 1908, 1912, or 1920). Three of the six finalists from 1972 returned: gold medalist Sawao Katō of Japan, bronze medalist Eizo Kenmotsu of Japan, and sixth-place finisher Nikolai Andrianov of the Soviet Union. Kenmotsu had won the 1974 world championship, with Andrianov the runner-up.

Israel made its debut in the men's parallel bars. The United States made its 13th appearance, most of any nation, having missed only the inaugural 1896 Games.

Competition format

Each nation entered a team of six gymnasts or up to three individual gymnasts. All entrants in the gymnastics competitions performed both a compulsory exercise and a voluntary exercise for each apparatus. The scores for all 12 exercises were summed to give an individual all-around score. These exercise scores were also used for qualification for the apparatus finals. The two exercises (compulsory and voluntary) for each apparatus were summed to give an apparatus score. The top 6 in each apparatus participated in the finals, except that nations were limited to two finalists each; others were ranked 7th through 90th. Half of the preliminary score carried over to the final.

Schedule

All times are Eastern Daylight Time (UTC-4)

Results

Ninety gymnasts competed in the compulsory and optional rounds on July 18 and 20. The six highest scoring gymnasts advanced to the final on July 23. Each country was limited to two competitors in the final. Half of the points earned by each gymnast during both the compulsory and optional rounds carried over to the final. This constitutes the "prelim" score.

References

Official Olympic Report
www.gymnasticsresults.com
www.gymn-forum.net

Men's parallel bars
Men's 1976
Men's events at the 1976 Summer Olympics